Adam Campbell (born Adam Jones; 19 August 1980) is an English actor. He has appeared in films, such as Date Movie (2006), Epic Movie (2007), and Wolves at the Door (2016). He played the role of Cal Vandeusen in the horror miniseries Harper's Island (2009). Campbell also appeared as Greg Walsh in the sitcom Great News (2017), and as young Donald Mallard on episodes of NCIS (2014–16, 2020).

Career
Campbell was first cast in Commando Nanny, an unaired sitcom for The WB Television Network, which was originally scheduled to premiere in 2004. He subsequently starred as Grant Fockyerdoder with Alyson Hannigan in the 2006 parody of romantic comedy films, Date Movie, which was a mild success at the American box office. He also starred in You Are Here, an independent film about a group of twenty-somethings, released in 2007. One of his biggest roles was in Epic Movie where he played a lead, Peter Pervertski. Campbell starred in the CBS mini-series Harper's Island as Cal Vandeusen.

In January 2010, Campbell was cast as the voice of Ringo Starr for the cancelled 3D remake of Yellow Submarine.

In 2015, Campbell appeared in the Emmy-nominated Netflix comedy series Unbreakable Kimmy Schmidt as Logan Beekman, the upper class 'Daddy's Boy' boyfriend of the title character, played by Ellie Kemper.

Between 2017 and 2018, Campbell played Greg Walsh in the NBC sitcom Great News. His character is an executive producer at The Breakdown and main character Katie's boss and love interest.

Personal life
In 2006, Campbell met his wife, American actress and singer Jayma Mays, on the set of the film Epic Movie. They married on 28 October 2007. On 27 April 2016, it was announced that Mays and Campbell were expecting their first child. Their son was born in August 2016.

Filmography

Film

Television

Web

Music videos

References

External links

 
 

Living people
1980 births
21st-century English male actors
Alumni of RADA
British expatriate male actors in the United States
English expatriates in the United States
English male film actors
English male television actors
English male voice actors
Male actors from Somerset
People educated at Beechen Cliff School
People from Bath, Somerset